was a Japanese samurai of the Sengoku period. He was the son of Anayama Nobutsuna.

He enjoyed special status in the Takeda retainer band due to his marriage to Takeda Nobutora's daughter. Nobutomo fought with distinction during the attack on Suwa Yorishige in 1542. After his death on New Year's Day 1561, he was succeeded by his son Anayama Nobutada.

Nobutomo's grave can be found at Enzō-in Temple.

References
Nobutomo's biography in a database of Takeda retainer data

1506 births
1561 deaths
Samurai